City of district significance (or importance) is a type of an administrative division in some countries of the former Soviet Union.
 in Russia; see town of district significance
 in Ukraine; see city of district significance (Ukraine)

Cities by type